ISO/IEC 7812 Identification cards – Identification of issuers is an international standard published jointly by the International Organization for Standardization (ISO) and the International Electrotechnical Commission (IEC). It specifies "a numbering system for the identification of the card issuers, the format of the issuer identification number (IIN) and the primary account number (PAN)", and procedures for registering IINs. It was first published in 1989.

ISO/IEC 7812 has two parts:
 Part 1: Numbering system
 Part 2: Application and registration procedures

The registration authority for Issuer Identification Numbers (IINs) is the American Bankers Association.

An IIN is currently six digits in length.  The leading digit is the major industry identifier (MII), followed by 5 digits, which together make up the IIN.  This IIN is paired with an individual account identification number, and a single digit checksum.

In 2015, the industry began work on implementing a change to ISO/IEC 7812 to increase the length of the IIN to 8 digits. The 2017 revision of the standard defines the new eight digit IIN and outlines a timeline for conversion of existing six digits IINs to eight digit IINs.

Major industry identifier
The first (leading) digit of the IIN identifies the major industry of the card issuer.

MII 9 has been assigned to national standards bodies for national use.  The first digit is a 9 followed by a three-digit numeric country code numeric-3 country code from ISO 3166-1. National Numbering Systems are managed by ISO-member national standards bodies.  The US National Numbering system is managed by the American National Standards Institute.

Issuer identifier number
The first six or eight digits, including the major industry identifier, compose the issuer identifier number (IIN) which identifies the issuing organization. The IIN is sometimes referred to as a "bank identification number" (BIN).  The IIN's use is much broader than identification of a bank.  IINs are used by companies other than banks.

IIN Register
The official "ISO Register of Issuer Identification Numbers", is not available to the general public. It is only available to institutions who hold IINs published in the register, financial networks and processors. Institutions are required to sign a licensing agreement before they are given access to the register. Several IINs are well known, especially those representing credit card issuers.

Individual account identification
In conjunction with the IIN, card issuers assign an account number to a card holder.  The account number is variable in length with a maximum of 12 digits when used in conjunction with a six digit IIN. When using an eight digit IIN, the maximum total length of the primary account number (PAN) remains at 19 digits. The PAN comprises the IIN, the individual account identifier, and the check digit, so when using an eight digit IIN, the maximum length of an individual account identifier would only be 10 digits.

Check digit
The final digit is a check digit which is calculated using the Luhn algorithm, defined in Annex B of ISO/IEC 7812-1.

References 

American Bankers Association
Identifiers
07812